Multilotto  is a licensed gambling firm. The company was founded in 2012 is headquartered in Malta. Multilotto is known for offering players the courier service model in 2012 but in 2015 the company changed its business model and is now offering the opportunity to bet on the outcome of a number of international and state lottery draws.

Multilotto is powered by Lotto Warehouse, which received the Malta Gaming Authority's first B2B lottery betting licence.

Company history
The company primarily focused on the Nordic market and in 2017 launched in the Republic of Ireland and in the UK.
Multilotto ceased operations for the foreseeable future in January 2022.

References

External links

Gambling companies of Sweden
Gambling companies of Malta